John Pearce (born 3 May 1960) is a Canadian equestrian. He competed in two events at the 2000 Summer Olympics.

References

External links
 

1960 births
Living people
Canadian male equestrians
Olympic equestrians of Canada
Equestrians at the 2000 Summer Olympics
Sportspeople from Toronto